Andriantsivalana is a rural commune in Madagascar. It belongs to the district of Ambatolampy, which is a part of Vakinankaratra region. The population of the commune was 24,247 in 2018.

Primary and junior level secondary education are available in town. The majority 96% of the population of the commune are farmers, while an additional 1% receives their livelihood from raising livestock. The most important crop is rice, while other important products are beans, maize and sweet potatoes.  Industry and services provide employment for 1% and 2% of the population, respectively.

References

Populated places in Vakinankaratra